Immortal is a remix album of music originally recorded by American recording artist Michael Jackson, released on November 18, 2011 by Epic Records. The album is also a soundtrack to Cirque du Soleil's Michael Jackson: The Immortal World Tour, which debuted on October 2, 2011 in Montreal.

Background and release
On October 3, 2011, Sony Music Entertainment announced that over 40 of Jackson's original recordings had been redesigned and reimagined by producer Kevin Antunes (Justin Timberlake, Rihanna) after working with original multi-track master recordings in the studio for a year. Immortal continued in the production vein of soundtracks from previous Cirque du Soleil shows: namely, 2006's Love, featuring the remixed music of the Beatles (for the show of the same name); and 2010's Elvis Presley-themed remix soundtrack Viva Elvis (for the show of the same name).

Being released by Epic Records in conjunction with the estate of Michael Jackson, Immortal featured an alternative version of the Jackson 5 song "ABC", as well as a series of mashups and remixes, such as a choir-assisted rendition of "They Don't Care About Us". Despite over 60 songs having been used for the stage show, the album release is available only as either a 20-track album or deluxe 27-track album.

Immortal is the eighth Jackson album to be released by Sony and Universal Motown since Jackson's death on June 25, 2009. It is also the third set of remixes of Jackson's music that has been released posthumously, following two 2009 collections: The Stripped Mixes, Jackson's early songs with most of the rhythm section edited out; and four EPs under the common title The Remix Suite.

Promotion
The debut track from the album, "Immortal Megamix", composed of four of Jackson's greatest hits—"Can You Feel It", "Don't Stop 'Til You Get Enough", "Billie Jean" and "Black or White"—was unveiled on AOL Music on October 31, 2011. Following the premiere on AOL, the track became available to stream at Jackson's official website and Facebook page. On November 1, 2011, the track became available as a digital download on iTunes and Amazon. There was no television promotion or radio airplay.

The week before the soundtrack's release, several tracks were unveiled on SoundCloud and Billboard:

"You Are Not Alone/I Just Can't Stop Loving You (Immortal Version)", on November 14, 2011.

"Wanna Be Startin' Somethin' (Immortal Version)", on November 15, 2011.

"I'll Be There (Immortal Version)" and "Dancing Machine/Blame It on the Boogie (Immortal Version)", on November 16, 2011.

"This Place Hotel/Smooth Criminal/Dangerous (Immortal Version)"1 and "Is It Scary/Threatened/Thriller (Immortal Version)"2, on November 17, 2011.

Antunes, the musical designer for Immortal, said, "There are jewels throughout this entire CD ... put there so you can truly appreciate Michael's musicality," adding, "It lifts you up, it challenges, it makes you feel. Being a super-fan myself, having the ability to work on this music is a true honor." The entire album was unveiled via NPR on November 18, 2011.

Commercial performance
In the United States, an early estimate predicted Immortal would sell 50,000 copies in its first week. The album opened with 43,000 copies sold, debuting at No. 24 on the Billboard 200. Immortal'''s opening week was more successful than the troupe's previous Viva Elvis, which had debuted and peaked at No. 48 in 2010 with 13,000 sold in its first week. In Japan, 150,000 CD copies of Immortal were sold during the first week of its release.Immortal was ranked number 174 on the list of the 200 best-selling albums of 2012 from the year-end charts of Billboard. It was also ranked number 35 on the top-selling 100 R&B albums of 2012. It is currently the second-best selling Cirque show release, after Love.

Critical reception
The debut song, "Immortal Megamix", received mixed reviews from music critics. Scott Shetler from PopCrush said the original songs were "left intact on this remix with only slight musical embellishments, such as a 'Michael! Michael!' chant that appears during 'Billie Jean'". While Shetler felt that other mixes, such as the "HIStory Megamix" that preceded Jackson's 1995 double album, were better, he also felt that, "with [Jackson's] legacy of musical gold, it would be nearly impossible to create a bad mix."

The album itself also received mixed reviews. Ann Powers from NPR said the soundtrack "adds another dimension to the Jackson omnibus" and "crafts a new version of Jackson's life story through remixes of his biggest hits and a few obscurities, as well as his own stated favorite songs." Randall Roberts from the Los Angeles Times gave the album two and a half stars out of four, stating, "the soundtrack is beholden to the Cirque/Immortal storyline and therefore sequenced not for the dance floor but for a Las Vegas-style production." Chad Grischow from IGN observed that "the collection at least does a fine job pulling from the various eras of his career", even though "most of the songs are simply clipped into a shorter version of themselves, with the occasional sound effects to enhance the choreography left feeling odd without it."

Gary Trust and Keith Caulfield from Billboard pointed out that "consumers surely didn't seem that interested in the mash-up style album." Nekesa Mumbi Moody from The Associated Press said, "much of the album seems disjointed. Some songs are oddly chopped up, others are spliced together without much finesse, and there are a myriad of sound effects — bullets firing, glass shattering, the whistle of a train, basketballs bouncing — that just sound like noise". Moody concluded that, "on stage, it probably all makes sense beautifully ... but without that visual picture, the listening experience is a disappointment."

Killian Fox of The Observer noted that "not much here is new", adding that "the album tries to justify its bulky existence" but ultimately "add[s] little to a catalogue of music that has already been superbly produced." Arwa Haider from Metro said, "the original songs are obviously fantastic", but "without the accompanying Cirque du Soleil acrobatics, these slightly spooky mixes don't add much to his canon." Michael Langston Moore from African American Entertainment Examiner said the album was "deemed to be a bit sacrilege".

Track listing
MJJ Productions Inc, the record division of the Michael Jackson Company LLC, announced the titles of the tracks on Immortal and Immortal (Deluxe) as follows:

Track elements
Credits adapted from the album booklet liner notes.

"The Immortal Intro" – "Remember the Time" / "You Rock My World" / "In the Closet" / "Stranger in Moscow" / "Bad" / "Smooth Criminal" / "Dangerous" / "Another Part of Me" / "The Way You Make Me Feel" / "Jam" / "Scream" / "I Want You Back" / "ABC" / "Rockin' Robin" / "Goin' Back to Indiana" / "I Got the Feelin'" (Motown audition) / "I'll Be There"

"Dancing Machine" / "Blame It on the Boogie" (Immortal Version) – "Dancing Machine" / "Blame It on the Boogie" / "Why You Wanna Trip on Me"

"Dangerous" (Immortal Version) – "Dangerous" / "In the Closet" (including elements from the music video, particularly Naomi Campbell's vocals)

"The Mime Segment" – "(I Like) The Way You Love Me" / "Speed Demon" / "Workin' Day and Night" (1978 Home Demo Recording) / "Hollywood Tonight" / "Another Part of Me" / "Stranger in Moscow" / "Black or White" (elements from the short film, specifically the black panther dance part)

"The Jackson 5 Medley" – "I Want You Back" / "ABC" / "The Love You Save"

"Is It Scary" / "Threatened" (Immortal Version) – "Is It Scary" / "Threatened" / "Somebody's Watching Me" / "Ghosts" / "Monster" / "Thriller"

"You Are Not Alone" / "I Just Can't Stop Loving You" (Immortal Version) – "You Are Not Alone" / "I Just Can't Stop Loving You" / "Todo Mi Amor Eres Tú" / "Remember the Time"

"Beat It" / "State of Shock" (Immortal Version) – "Beat It" / "State of Shock" / "Bad" (elements from the short film)

"They Don't Care About Us" (Immortal Version) – "Scream" / "They Don't Care About Us" / "Tabloid Junkie" / "Privacy"

"Will You Be There" (Immortal Version) – "Heal the World" / "Will You Be There"

"Immortal Megamix" (Immortal'' Version) – "Can You Feel It" / "Don't Stop 'Til You Get Enough" / "Billie Jean" / "Black or White"

Charts

Weekly charts

Year-end charts

Release history

See also
 List of unreleased Michael Jackson material
 List of works published posthumously

References

External links 
 

2011 soundtrack albums
2011 remix albums
2011 compilation albums
Michael Jackson compilation albums
Cirque du Soleil albums
Albums produced by Michael Jackson
Epic Records soundtracks
Epic Records remix albums
Epic Records compilation albums
Theatre soundtracks
Soundtracks published posthumously
Remix albums published posthumously
Compilation albums published posthumously